Brotia verbecki is a species of freshwater snail with an operculum, an aquatic gastropod mollusk in the family Pachychilidae.

Distribution 
This species occurs in:
 Sumatra, Indonesia

References

External links 

verbecki
Gastropods described in 1866